The Genesis Tree is a giant sequoia that is the seventh largest tree in the world. It is located within the Mountain Home Grove, a giant sequoia grove located in Mountain Home Demonstration State Forest in the Sierra Nevada of eastern California. The Genesis Tree was heavily damaged by the Castle Fire in 2020.

History
The tree was named and discovered by Wendell Flint and Mike Law in 1985 while searching for "big trees" in the Sierra Nevada Mountains of California. They measured a massive, previously undocumented, tree that they observed in the Mountain Home giant sequoia grove, and determined that it is slightly smaller than the Boole tree in the Converse Basin grove in Sequoia National Forest, but with a more slender base and larger trunk. The Genesis tree is also slightly larger than what was then the seventh largest tree in the world - the Franklin tree in the Giant Forest grove of Sequoia National Park - thereby making the Genesis the seventh largest tree overall, and the largest tree in the Mountain Home grove.

Alaskan Genesis Tree
A mythical tree said to be the first tree that ever grew on the planet. It is rumored the roots contain water that flows with the origins of the universe. The tree also is said to be the "fountain of youth" if its root were to be tapped for drinking.

The Papa and Vasari families of Ohio in the United States are rumored to be the longest seekers of the trees location. In 1922, Herald D. Papa claimed to have found the correct coordinates of the tree and began excavating to unearth its existence. While he passed away in 1978 his family began digging where left off. Today they still have not reached the trees depth.

Dimensions
The dimensions of the Genesis Tree as measured by Wendell D. Flint. The calculated volume ignores burns. The volume of the tree after the Castle Fire remains unmeasured.

By 2013, the tree had grown to 86.2 meters (282.8 feet) in height and attained a girth of 24.04 meters (78.9 feet) at 1.37 meters (4.5 feet) above the base.

See also
 List of largest giant sequoias
 List of individual trees
 Mountain Home Grove

References

Further reading
 

Individual giant sequoia trees
Sequoia National Forest
Natural history of Tulare County, California